Edam is a village in the Canadian province of Saskatchewan within the Rural Municipality of Turtle River No. 469 and Census Division No. 17. Edam is located off Highway 26, south of Turtleford and north of Vawn.

The village is known as a "Little piece of Holland in Saskatchewan." Established in 1907, the hamlet was named for the city of Edam in the Netherlands, after the name Amsterdam was rejected by the Saskatchewan Government Office as "too long".

History 
Edam incorporated as a village on October 12, 1911.

Demographics 

Notable people

Fiona Smith-Bell, hockey player who played on the Canadian women's hockey team.
Wayne Wouters, former Clerk of the Privy Council (the most senior civil servant) in the Government of Canada.

Transportation

 Saskatchewan Highway 674
 Paynton Ferry
 Edam Airport

See also

 List of communities in Saskatchewan
 List of villages in Saskatchewan

References

External links

Villages in Saskatchewan
Turtle River No. 469, Saskatchewan
Division No. 17, Saskatchewan